Beatrice Rugland Timgren (born 12 May 1989 in Stockholm) is a Swedish politician of the Sweden Democrats party who has been a member of the Riksdag since 2022 representing the Stockholm County constituency.

Biography
Timgren grew up in Stockholm and graduated with a degree in engineering from the KTH Royal Institute of Technology. She then worked as an engineering technician and a manager in the automotive industry. She currently resides in Ekerö with her husband and two children.

She was previously a member of the Moderate Party and sympathized with the Christian Democrats for a period before joining the Sweden Democrats in 2018, citing her concerns on terrorism, illegal immigration and gang activity in Sweden and Europe. She unsuccessfully stood for the SD during the 2019 European Parliament election. She has also served as a county councilor and an executive on the local party committee for the SD in Ekerö. For the 2022 Swedish general election, she contested the Riksdag constituency list of Stockholm County and was successful at winning a seat.

See also 

 List of members of the Riksdag, 2022–2026

References 

1989 births
Members of the Riksdag from the Sweden Democrats
21st-century Swedish politicians
21st-century Swedish women politicians
Women members of the Riksdag
Living people
Members of the Riksdag 2022–2026